Hyphantria penthetria is a moth of the family Erebidae. It was described by Harrison Gray Dyar Jr. in 1912. It is found in Mexico.

References

 Arctiidae genus list at Butterflies and Moths of the World of the Natural History Museum

Spilosomina
Moths described in 1912